Qin Shi Huang (259 BC – 210 BC) was the founder and First Emperor of the Qin Dynasty.

Qin Shi Huang may also refer to:
Rise of the Great Wall (Chinese title: 秦始皇), a 1985 Hong Kong TV series
Qin Shi Huang (2001 TV series), a 2001 Chinese TV series